The 1999 ICF Canoe Sprint World Championships were held in Milan, Italy at the Idroscalo.

The men's competition consisted of nine Canadian (single paddle, open boat) and nine kayak events. Women competed in eight events, all kayak.

This was the 30th championships in canoe sprint.

Medal summary

Men's

Canoe

Kayak

Women's

Kayak

Medal table

References
ICF medalists for Olympic and World Championships - Part 1: flatwater (now sprint): 1936-2007.
ICF medalists for Olympic and World Championships - Part 2: rest of flatwater (now sprint) and remaining canoeing disciplines: 1936-2007.

Sprint World Championships, 1999
1999 in Italian sport
1999
International sports competitions hosted by Italy
Canoeing and kayaking competitions in Italy
Sports competitions in Milan